Christian List  (born 1973) is a German philosopher and political scientist who serves as professor of philosophy and decision theory at the Ludwig Maximilian University of Munich and co-director of the Munich Center for Mathematical Philosophy. He was previously professor of political science and philosophy at the London School of Economics. List's research interests relate to social choice theory, formal epistemology, political philosophy, and the philosophy of social science.

Born in Nastätten, Germany, on 7 November 1973, List earned his Bachelor of Arts and Master of Philosophy degrees at St Peter's College, and his Doctor of Philosophy degree at Nuffield College, both University of Oxford. He was elected to the British Academy in 2014, the United Kingdom's national academy for the humanities and social sciences.

Selected publications

Independence and Interdependence: Lessons from the Hive. London School of Economics and Political Science, London, 2010. (With Adrian Vermeule)
Where Do Preferences Come From? London School of Economics and Political Science, London, 2010. (With Franz Dietrich)
Group Agency: The Possibility, Design, and Status of Corporate Agents. Oxford University Press, Oxford, 2011. (With Philip Pettit)
"Emergent Chance", The Philosophical Review, 124 (1), 2015, pp. 119–152. (With Marcus Pivato)
Why Free Will Is Real May 6, 2019, Harvard University Press;

References

External links
 

1973 births
21st-century German male writers
21st-century German non-fiction writers
21st-century German philosophers
21st-century political scientists
Academics of the London School of Economics
Alumni of Nuffield College, Oxford
Alumni of St Peter's College, Oxford
Analytic philosophers
Decision theory
Epistemologists
Fellows of the British Academy
German expatriates in England
German male non-fiction writers
German political philosophers
German political scientists
Living people
Academic staff of the Ludwig Maximilian University of Munich
People from Rhein-Lahn-Kreis
Philosophers of social science
Social choice theory
Writers from Rhineland-Palatinate